Lawrence Hare (born 23 December 1969) is a former international speedway rider from England.

Speedway career 
Hare reached the final of the British Speedway Championship in 1998. He rode in the top tier of British Speedway from 1991 to 2002, riding for various clubs.

During a match in 2002, he was riding for the Exeter Falcons when he crashed which resulted in paralysis from a back injury.

References 

Living people
1969 births
British speedway riders
Edinburgh Monarchs riders
Exeter Falcons riders
Ipswich Witches riders
Oxford Cheetahs riders
Rye House Rockets riders